Medipalle (or Medipalli) is a mandal in Jagtial District, Telangana, India.

Villages
There are 19 villages in Medipalle mandal. They are:
 Bheemaram
 Dhammannapeta
 Govindaram
 Kacharam
 Kalvakota
 Katlakunta 
 Kondapur
 Lingampeta
 Machapur
 Mannnegudem
 Medipalle
 Pasunoor
 Porumalla
 Raghojipeta
 Rangapur
 ThombaraoPeta
 Vallampalle
 Venkataraopeta
 Voddedu

References 

Villages in Jagtial district
Mandal headquarters in Jagtial district